The 2006 Hypo Group Tennis International was a men's tennis tournament that was part of the 2006 ATP Tour. The event was won by Nikolay Davydenko in men's singles and Paul Hanley and Jim Thomas in men's doubles.

Finals

Singles

 Nikolay Davydenko defeated  Andrei Pavel, 6–3, 6–0

Doubles

 Paul Hanley /  Jim Thomas defeated  Oliver Marach /  Cyril Suk, 6–3, 4–6, [10–5]

References

External links
 ITF tournament edition details

Hypo Group Tennis International
Hypo Group Tennis International
2006 in Austrian tennis